Robert Therry (born 27 June 1947) is a French politician who has been Member of Parliament for Pas-de-Calais's 4th constituency from 2020 to 2022, when he replaced Daniel Fasquelle.

References 

Living people

1947 births
People from Pas-de-Calais
Deputies of the 15th National Assembly of the French Fifth Republic
21st-century French politicians
The Republicans (France) politicians